Scottish Marches was the term used for the Anglo-Scottish border during the late medieval and early modern eras, characterised by violence and cross-border raids. The Scottish Marches era came to an end during the first decade of the 17th century following the union of the crowns of England and Scotland.

History

Origins

The Marches were first conceived in a treaty between Henry III of England and Alexander III of Scotland in 1249 as an attempt to control the Anglo-Scottish border by providing a buffer zone. On each side of the Anglo-Scottish border there was the West March, the Middle March and the East March. These regions nearly mirrored each other but there was some overlap between the Scottish and English regions. In the late 13th century Edward I of England appointed the first Lord Warden of the Marches, who was tasked with overseeing these regions and keeping their monarch's domain secure; when it was in their interests they would encourage cross-border raiding, or even full-scale war.

Especially in the Tudor period some inhabitants of the Marches on either side of the Border exhibited mixed national allegiances, and parts of the region were home to Riding Surnames or clans. Before the two kingdoms were united in March 1603, under the personal union of Scotland and England under James VI of Scotland (James I of England), the border clans would switch allegiance between the Scottish and English thrones depending on what was most favourable for the members of the clan. For a time, powerful local clans dominated a region on the border between England and Scotland, known as the Debatable Lands, where neither monarch's writ was heeded.

During this era, the Border Reivers were raiders that attacked local residents. There were both English and Scottish clans in these groups, and they would attack regardless of nationality. Local farmers would often need to make payments to the various clans as a form of protection money to ensure they are not attacked. These agreements were called "Black mal", where mal was an Old Norse word meaning agreement. The word blackmail entered the English language in 1530 as a result.

The fluid nature of the border, and the frequent wars between Scotland and England, made the Marches fertile ground for many bandits and reivers (raiders) who exploited the situation. The Wardens of the Marches on either side of the border were entrusted with the difficult task of keeping the peace and punishing wrongdoers; the Scottish and English Wardens would meet to co-ordinate their efforts against free-lance reivers at "days of march" (or "days of truce"), when they implemented March law, a kind of customary law agreed upon by the two realms during times of peace.

The reiver period produced one unique architectural feature in the old reiver country—the peel tower, a defensive structure found on many great houses (and indeed on Carlisle Cathedral). It has also produced a great deal of romantic literature, most famously the works of Sir Walter Scott.

Berwick-upon-Tweed, a strategic town on the north bank of the River Tweed, (the traditional border in the East March), is slightly closer to Edinburgh than to Newcastle. It was fought over many times: between 1147 and 1482, the town changed hands between the two nations more than 13 times. As late as the reign of Elizabeth I of England, the English considered it worth spending a fortune on the latest style of fortifications (trace italienne) to secure the town against Scottish attack.

17th century
The Scottish Marches era came to an end during the first decade of the 17th century with the creation of the Middle Shires, promulgated after the personal union of Scotland and England under James VI of Scotland (James I of England).

Notes

References

See also
 March law

Further reading

13th century in England
13th century in Scotland
14th century in England
14th century in Scotland
15th century in England
15th century in Scotland
16th century in England
16th century in Scotland
Anglo-Scottish border
Border Reivers
Marches (country subdivision)